Chappuisius is a genus of crustaceans belonging to the monotypic family Chappuisiidae.

The species of this genus are found in Central Europe.

Species:

Chappuisius inopinus 
Chappuisius singeri

References

Crustaceans